Jack Harrison (born 4 October 1995) is an English former first-class cricketer.

Harrison was born at Leeds. He was educated at The Grammar School at Leeds, before going up to Pembroke College, Oxford where he read economics and management. While studying at Oxford, he made a single appearance in first-class cricket for Oxford University against Cambridge University in The University Match of 2017 at Fenner's. Playing as a wicket-keeper, he batted twice in the match and was dismissed for 38 runs in the Oxford first innings by James Poulson by a ball that commentators described as "unplayable", while in their second innings he was dismissed for 14 runs by Ruari Crichard. Behind the stumps he took five catches and made a single stumping.

References

External links

1995 births
Living people
cricketers from Leeds
People educated at the Grammar School at Leeds
Alumni of Pembroke College, Oxford
English cricketers
Oxford University cricketers